Folkestone services is a motorway service station on the M20 motorway at Westenhanger, seven miles from Folkestone in Kent, England. They are the second to be built on the motorway and were opened in 2007.

The services are found off Junction 11. They contain a petrol station, parking for both cars and lorries, a number of shops including W H Smith.

A lorry park with 82 parking spaces and customs clearance facilities provided by Channel Ports Ltd has been operated on the site since 2011.

History
Junctions 10 to 13 of the M20 motorway were opened in 1981. Prior to the construction of the services, the proposed site was subjected to an archaeological investigation. This was because the area was close to known archaeological sites. Shards of pottery dating from the 1st–4th centuries were discovered and there may have been a Roman settlement between the current site of the services and line of the nearby Roman road from Lympne to Canterbury.

Facilities
Stop 24 Folkestone services has no on-site hotel. The closest is located at Roadchef Maidstone services.

Restaurants
 Burger 100
 Subway
 KFC
 Real cafe co.
 Chopstix noodle bar.

Petrol station
The Petrol station at stop 24 is a shell station.

Other Facilities
 WHSmith
 Bureau de Change
 Showers

References

External links
Website
Website ChannelPorts website
Website Harbour Shipping website
Stop 24 services - Motorway Services Online
Stop 24 services - Motorway Services Information

M20 motorway service stations
Transport in Kent